Arthur Moore (1887 – 20 January 1949) was a Welsh wireless operator who heard a distress signal from  before news of the disaster arrived in the UK.  Following the notoriety of this feat he went on to a successful career in sales, management and development of early radio.

Early life

Moore was born in Pontllanfraith, the eldest son of local miller, William Moore. At a young age Moore was involved in an accident at the mill, which resulted in the loss of the lower part of one of his legs, and for the rest of his life, he wore a wooden leg.
By the age of ten, Moore had developed an interest in amateur engineering and he adapted a bicycle to cater for his wooden leg, and locals recall him rattling around the village on it. As he grew, he became what is known as a "character" in the locality. 
At some point prior to 1909, most likely in his early teenage years, Moore, a keen amateur engineer, using a hand made lathe driven by the water-wheel at the mill, built a working model of a horizontal steam engine. He entered the model in a competition in The Model Engineer magazine. He received as his prize a book by Sir Oliver Lodge entitled Modern Views of Magnetism And Electricity, which awakened his interest in wireless.

Home-made wireless station
Working at Gelligroes Mill in Pontllanfraith near Blackwood, he soon began erecting wire aerials and building his rudimentary radio station, consisting of a coherer-based receiver and a spark-gap transmitter. It was his engineering talent that enabled him to store electricity in his batteries via a generator coupled to the mill wheel itself. The same generator was also used to charge batteries for the local farms that were at that time not connected to the mains supply.

Moore was almost continually experimenting with wireless by this time, often defying his father and staying up into the early hours, sitting at his station listening to the signals emanating from ships, both naval and merchant, travelling the coastal waters around Wales, the south-west of England, as well as stations on the Continent.

Sometimes, in an attempt to improve reception he would relocate his station and set it up at a farm high up on Mynyddislwyn.

Using the contemporary although basic spark-gap transmitter technology of the time, Moore together with his friend Richard Jenkins, an electrical engineer at the local coal mine, made what was probably the first use in Wales of amateur wireless for business purposes. Having set up a second transmitting and receiving station at Ty Llwyd farm, owned by Jenkins's father which was located approximately three and a half miles south of Gelligroes at Ynysddu in the direction of Newport, Moore received an order over the air for grain to be delivered from the mill to the farm.

Front-page news in 1911

A further exciting development took place when Moore made the front page of the London newspaper The Daily Sketch after he intercepted the Italian government's declaration of war on Libya in 1911.

In 1912, Moore was 26 years old and his wireless construction knowledge and skills had improved to such an extent that he was able to build more sensitive receiving equipment and he therefore began to receive transmissions on a regular basis, often relaying the information to the locals sometimes many days before it appeared in the national press.

Titanic's message
It was his reception of the s distress call which propelled Moore into a career that was to take him from that little mill in Wales and on to greater things within the realms of early wireless development.

In the early hours of 15 April 1912, in the loft of the 17th century Gelligroes Mill, near Blackwood, Monmouthshire, Moore using crude radio apparatus received a faint signal in Morse Code:

"CQD CQD SOS de MGY Position 41.44N 50.24W. Require immediate assistance. Come at once. We have struck an iceberg. Sinking….We are putting the women off in the boats….."

Moore continued to copy out the Morse signals he was receiving: "We are putting the passengers off in small boats" "Women and children in boats, cannot last much longer….."

Then came the final signal: "Come as quickly as possible old man; our engine-room is filling up to the boilers."

Moore relayed the news to the locals and to the local constabulary, who did not believe him.  Two days later, the locals received confirmation through the local and national press that it was true.  The newspapers also confirmed – as Moore had claimed — that the "SOS" distress signal (first practically used in 1909) had been used by the Titanics radio operators along with the standard British "CQD" distress signal, thus proving that Moore had indeed received the signals from the doomed liner.

In 1912 it was understood that the range of Titanics wireless was 400 miles in daylight, and possibly up to 2000 miles in darkness. It now became clear that Moore had received radio waves from 3000 miles using nothing more than his own crude home-made equipment.

Enter Marconi

In the summer of 1912, Moore's activities and the publicity surrounding him following the Titanic disaster soon led to him coming to the attention of the then Monmouthshire Education Committee, who offered him a scholarship to the British School of Telegraphy in Clapham, London, so he left to embark on his studies in the world of science and wireless communication. After studying for just three months, Moore was advised by the Principal there to enter for a Government examination in Wireless Telegraphy and Morse Code, in which he was successful.

It was at this time that Moore's activities, not least his reception of the Titanics distress calls, came to the attention of Guglielmo Marconi, the "father of wireless" himself.  One local resident wrote to Marconi to inform him of Moore's achievement. 
Marconi then came to Gelligroes to meet Moore and to discuss his work and his experiments, and he invited Moore to join the Marconi Company as a draughtsman.

By 1914, Moore was transferred to the Ship Equipment Department of the Marconi Company, and on the outbreak of the First World War he was engaged as a technician in "special Admiralty fittings" – working on the armed merchant ships which operated clandestinely on the open seas and were known as Q-ships.
He also supervised the installation of wireless equipment on the Dreadnought-class battleships HMS Invincible and HMS Inflexible which steamed the 8,000 miles south to the Falkland Islands in 1914, to face down a German naval threat to the south Atlantic islands.
Connected with the Admiralty through the Marconi Company, Moore later became assistant to Captain H.J. Round (who was himself Chief Assistant to Guglielmo Marconi), and he worked with Captain Round on the further development of the thermionic radio valve without which advancements in radio could not have taken place.

Peacetime activities

Following the cessation of hostilities and the end of World War I in 1918, Moore was appointed to the Marconi Company's Liverpool establishment. There he took charge of the newly formed Ship Equipment Department, where the latest and most up-to-date transmitters were being fitted.

In 1922 he supervised and oversaw the fitting of the first trawler to be equipped with wireless telegraphy equipment.

A year later he was transferred from the Marconi Company to the Marconi International Marine Communication Company and their establishment at Avonmouth, where he was appointed Manager.

Echometer

Not content simply to "manage", Moore's innovative and inventive spirit led him to patent a very early form of Sonar (called the "Echometer") in 1932, and, as is quoted in the following excerpt from his obituary written by Councillor Richard Vines, Headmaster of Pontllanfraith Technical School: "his inventive mind gave to science many devices by which he will be remembered as one who succeeded through industry." He also devised other measuring devices: "His Alvis car was fitted with an apparatus which would record on a dial the efficiency of petrol at varying speeds with various loads through all gears"

Moore remained at Marconi's Avonmouth establishment until his retirement in 1947, but by 1948, with his health failing he moved to Jamaica to recuperate. He was 62, and would never return to Wales, his homeland.  After only six months in Jamaica he left for England, and on Thursday 20 January 1949 he died in a Bristol convalescent home.

In 1949 Monmouthshire Councillor Richard Vine's public appreciation of Moore concluded with the words: "Gelligroes has invariably been coupled with Islwyn the poet and philosopher, and now it also has associations with the world of science."

Legacy

Despite contributing greatly to the advancement of radio in those early days, Moore's pioneering efforts in wireless communications remain relatively little known, even within his own locality. However, the inspiration he gave to budding wireless enthusiasts in his local area led to the creation in 1927 of the Blackwood Transmitters Club, which later became the Blackwood Amateur Radio Society, which still exists to this day.

Today, Moore's mill at Gelligroes stands silent and idle, and is now used as a store for materials for the candlemakers workshop nearby.

A group of local amateur radio enthusiasts are creating an "Artie Moore archive" and continue to search out information regarding this sadly unsung, but remarkable and extraordinary Welshman, to tell the full story of Moore, of his connection with the historic Titanic disaster and of his exploits in early wireless communication. 
They have also periodically set up an amateur radio station at the Gelligroes Mill, transmitting with the callsign MW0MNX (Moore's own station's original callsign had been "MNX"), and Moore's mill has, for the first time in nearly one hundred years, once again reverberated to the magical sound of Morse Code.

References

'Artie Moore – The Forgotten Spark' published by Leighton Smart 2005.
Daily Sketch 1911.
Merthyr Express 1949.
South Wales Argus 1949.
Practical Wireless magazine 2004.
'One Last Dance' audio recording by Philip Thomas.

Welsh electrical engineers
Welsh inventors
RMS Titanic
1887 births
1949 deaths
European amateur radio operators
People from Blackwood, Caerphilly
20th-century British inventors